Wisner may refer to:

People 
Wisner (surname)

Places 
In the United States:
 Wisner, Louisiana, a town in Franklin Parish
 Wisner, Nebraska, a city in Cuming County
 Wisner Township, Michigan, a township in Tuscola County
 Wisner Township, Cuming County, Nebraska

See also 
 Wiesner